Mzuzu University is one of the principal universities of Malawi. The university is located in Mzuzu, in the northern region of Malawi. It was founded in 1997 and accepted its first students in 1999. At the time the university opened its doors, the Chancellor was Malawi's former president Bakili Muluzi and the first Vice-Chancellor was Professor Terrence Davis. Professor Peter Mwanza, who later entered politics and became a cabinet minister, was active in establishing the university. He was Chairman of the University Council, and later Vice-Chancellor.

Academics

Faculties and Departments
The University consists of the following faculties and departments:
 Faculty of Education
 Educational Foundations
 Teaching, Learning and Curriculum Studies
 Inclusive Education

 Faculty of Environmental Studies
 Agri-Sciences
 Built Environment
 Fisheries and Aquatic Science
 Forestry and Environmental Management
 Geo-Science
 Water Resources Management

 Faculty of Health Sciences
Biomedical Sciences
Nursing and Midwifery
Optometry

Faculty of Humanities and Social Studies
 Language, Cultural and Creative Studies
 Communication Studies
 Theology and Religious Studies
 History and Heritage Studies
 Information Science
 Governance, Peace, and Security Studies
 Faculty of Science, Technology and Innovation
 Mathematics and Statistics * Mzuzu University mathematics department
 Physics and Electronics
 Biological Sciences
 Renewable Energy Studies
 Chemistry
 Information and Communication Technology

 Faculty of Tourism, Hospitality and Management Studies
 Tourism
 Hospitality Management
 Management and Entrepreneurial Studies

The Centre for Open and Distance e-Learning (CODeL) is the focal point for providing education off-campus, including continuing education.

Research
The school operates the following research centres:

 Centre of Excellence in Water and Sanitation
 The Test and Training Centre for Renewable Energy Technologies (TCRET)
 Centre for Inclusive Education
 Malawi eHealth Research Centre (MERC)

References

External links
 
Southern African Regional Universities Association

Universities in Malawi
Mzuzu
Buildings and structures in Northern Region, Malawi
1997 establishments in Malawi
Forestry education